Jamie Shanahan (born 1994) is an Irish hurler who plays as a left wing-back for club side Sixmilebridge and at inter-county level with the Clare senior hurling team.<ref></ref

Honours

Sixmilebridge
Clare Senior Hurling Championship (3): 2013, 2015, 2017

Clare
All-Ireland Senior Hurling Championship (1): 2013
National Hurling League (1): 2016
All-Ireland Under-21 Hurling Championship (1): 2014
Munster Under-21 Hurling Championship (1): 2014
Munster Minor Hurling Championship (2): 2010, 2011

References

1994 births
Living people
Sixmilebridge hurlers
Clare inter-county hurlers
Hurling backs